The 1964 Inter-Cities Fairs Cup Final was the final of the sixth Inter-Cities Fairs Cup and the first of two that were not played over two legs. It was played on 24 June 1964 between Real Zaragoza and Valencia of Spain. This marked the third consecutive appearance in the competition's final by Valencia, who entered the match as two-time defending Inter-Cities champions. However, Zaragoza won 2–1.

Route to the final

Match details

See also
1963–64 Inter-Cities Fairs Cup
Valencia CF in European football

References
RSSSF

Europa
Inter-Cities Fairs Cup Final 1964
Inter-Cities Fairs Cup Final 1964
1964
International club association football competitions hosted by Spain
Football in Barcelona
1963–64 in Spanish football
Sports competitions in Barcelona
1960s in Barcelona
1964 in Catalonia